is a Japanese television drama series that aired on TV Tokyo from 12 April 2013 to 5 July 2013.

Plot

Cast
 Aya Ōmasa as Sakurako, a 170-year-old vampire and Komachi's friend
 Tsubasa Honda as Komachi, a 165-year-old vampire
 Yūta Hiraoka as Hayato, a young man aspiring musician
 Satoshi Tomiura as Kentarō
 Anri Okamoto as Risa
 Touko Miura as Chisato
 Haruka Kurosawa as Mizuho
 Noriko Eguchi as Aoi
 Eisuke Sasai as Hakushaku, a vampire count over 300 years old
 Hidekazu Nagae as Genjūro
 Asaya Kimijima as Tobē

See also 
List of vampire television series

References

External links
  
 BS Japan website 
 
 ヴァンパイア・ヘヴン(2013) at allcinema 

Japanese drama television series
2013 Japanese television series debuts
2013 Japanese television series endings
Japanese romantic comedy television series
TV Tokyo original programming
Vampires in television